Crazy Love (蜜桃成熟時) is a 1993 Hong Kong film directed by Roman Cheung.

Plot
A young rich free girl Jane, visit Hongkong instead of UK for her summer vacation after find her cheating boyfriend. After several incidents she finds Kwan, next door in hotel and motivated for true happy love. In morning beach walk Jane met David, young struggling scriptwriter. Eventually fall love with him without realising it. Continues her quest of love.

Cast
 Loletta Lee as Jane
 Poon Jan-Waias David
 Shing Fui-On
 Tommy Wong
 Joh Chung-Sing
 Lisa Chiao Chiao

References

External links
 
 Crazy Love at Hong Kong Cinemagic
 Review at Love HK Film

Hong Kong erotic films
1990s Hong Kong films